Robert Whitehill may refer to:

 Robert Whitehill (Pennsylvania politician) (1738–1813), US Representative from Pennsylvania
 Robert Whitehill (Hebrew poet) (born 1947), American Hebrew poet